René Gottwald (born 30 January 1973) is a retired German football striker.

References

1973 births
Living people
German footballers
FC Hansa Rostock players
Rot-Weiß Oberhausen players
FC Wegberg-Beeck players
SV 19 Straelen players
TuRU Düsseldorf players
VfB Speldorf players
2. Bundesliga players
Association football forwards
People from Greifswald
Footballers from Mecklenburg-Western Pomerania